The NFL Show and NFL This Week were a pair of American football programmes broadcast on the BBC. The NFL Show now broadcasts on ITV, STV and Virgin Media Four.

Neither show had a fixed timeslot, but The NFL Show typically aired either on Saturday evenings or after midnight on BBC One.  NFL This Week was a BBC Two show, usually airing late on a Tuesday evening or shortly after midnight. The NFL Show was hosted by BBC Breakfast presenter Dan Walker, who took over from Mark Chapman, who stepped down from hosting this show since its launch in 2021.

For the 2022 season, the NFL announced that they had reached a partnership with commercial broadcaster ITV for three years. The show would now be hosted by Laura Woods, although analysts Bell and Umenyiora would follow the show across networks. The deal also continues to include live coverage of two London international games and the Super Bowl as the BBC did. The show will also air on the Scottish affiliate of the ITV network STV and Virgin Media Four in Ireland, which has a content sharing agreement with ITV.

Format

The NFL Show

On the BBC usually followed Match of the Day. On ITV it airs at 11:30PM on Fridays, although the first episode was pushed to ITV4 due to the death of Elizabeth II.

NFL This Week
NFL This Week was cancelled for the 2020-21 NFL season, but a revamped version of the highlights show was reintroduced for the 2021-22 season.

Analysts
Jason Bell is a former NFL cornerback.  He played for the Dallas Cowboys, the Houston Texans, and the New York Giants over a spell of six seasons.

Osi Umenyiora is a two-time Super Bowl-winning defensive end with the New York Giants.  He also played for the Atlanta Falcons for two seasons.

See also
 NFL on television

References

External links

2016 British television series debuts
2010s British sports television series
2020s British sports television series
BBC high definition shows
BBC Sport
BBC Television shows
English-language television shows
ITV Sport
National Football League television series